Yvon Cancino (born ) is a retired Peruvian female volleyball player.

She was part of the Peru women's national volleyball team at the 1998 FIVB Volleyball Women's World Championship in Japan. 
For the 2011–12 season she played with CV Deportivo Géminis and was the best setter at the 2011–12 Liga Nacional Superior de Voleibol Femenino.

References

1979 births
Living people
Peruvian women's volleyball players
Place of birth missing (living people)
20th-century Peruvian women
21st-century Peruvian women